Lion's Head Lighthouse was a  lighthouse on Georgian Bay, Ontario, Canada near the village of Lion's Head. A recent lighthouse was a replica built by local high school students. This was destroyed by several storms in the winter of 2019–2020.

History

The first lighthouse was a lantern, which emitted a red light, erected atop a pole on the outer end of the breakwater in 1903. In 1913 a wooden square tower with a balcony and lantern was built on the breakwater, but it was severely damaged by the wind, though it was repaired. The lighthouse was then damaged by fire in 1933, and the Canadian Coast Guard dismantled it in 1969. It was replaced by a metal pole which emitted a flashing red light.

In 1983 the students of the Bruce Peninsula District School completed a replica of the old wooden lighthouse with funds from the Lion's Head Rotary Club; the lighthouse was placed on the shoreline. A violent storm damaged the operating light in the spring of 2000, and the Canadian Coast Guard decided to replace it with the students' replica, which was moved to the end of the pier and activated.

The replica lighthouse was damaged from time to time by storms due to its precarious position. Some damage occurred in October 2019. The lake-facing wall of the lighthouse had cedar shakes ripped off and a hole punched through it. The shoreline of the nearby stone beach was altered by severe wave action.

A storm on January 11, 2020, destroyed the lighthouse and reduced it to a pile of scattered lumber by the morning of January 12.  The lighthouse has since been replaced by one that is in a slightly different location.  The replacement has also been built to a sturdier standard.

Keepers 
Charles Knapp 1903–1912 
Peter Webster Brady 1912–1924 
Ivan Butchart 1924–1956 
Ed Rouse 1956–1969

See also
 List of lighthouses in Ontario
 List of lighthouses in Canada

References

External links
Bruce County Lighthouses: Lion's Head 
 Aids to Navigation Canadian Coast Guard

Lighthouses completed in 1911
Lighthouses in Ontario
Buildings and structures in Bruce County
1911 establishments in Ontario
2020 disestablishments in Ontario
Lighthouses completed in 1983
Buildings and structures demolished in 2020
Demolished buildings and structures in Ontario